The Harkness table, Harkness method, or Harkness discussion is a teaching and learning method involving students seated in a large, oval configuration to discuss ideas in an encouraging, open-minded environment with only occasional or minimal teacher intervention.

Overview
The Harkness method is in use at many American boarding schools and colleges and encourages discussion in classes. The style is related to the Socratic method. Developed at Phillips Exeter Academy, the method's name comes from the oil magnate and philanthropist Edward Harkness, who presented the school with a monetary gift in 1930. It has been adopted in numerous schools, such as St. Mark's School of Texas and The Episcopal School of Dallas, where small class-size makes it effective, but it remains impractical for larger classes. Harkness described its use as follows:

What I have in mind is [a classroom] where [students] could sit around a table with a teacher who would talk with them and instruct them by a sort of tutorial or conference method, where [each student] would feel encouraged to speak up. This would be a real revolution in methods.

Harkness practices can vary, most notably between humanities subjects such as English and history and technical subjects such as math and physics.

References

External links
'Edward S. Harkness, 1874-1940', Richard F. Niebling, Phillips Exeter Academy (PDF)

Teaching in the United States
Phillips Exeter Academy